Wuqiu Township may refer to:

In the People's Republic of China
 Wuqiu Township, Changyuan County (武邱乡) in Changyuan County, Henan Province

In the Republic of China (Taiwan)
 Wuqiu Township, Kinmen County in Kinmen County, Fujian Province

See also
 Wuqiu (disambiguation)

Township name disambiguation pages